Jaggi (or Jäggi) is in found both European and Indian cultures as a surname and given name. There is no known crossover between the two origins. 

In Europe the name "Jaggi" is most often found in South German and Swiss German communities. There are two competing theories around the origin of the name.

The first is that the name is derived from the Biblical Hebrew "Yochanan", which translates as "He who Jehovah has favoured (with a son)".

The second is that the name derives from the Hebrew root "qb> Ya'akov", meaning " to follow, to be behind", and it refers to the circumstances of Jacob's birth when he held on to the heel of his older twin brother Esau.

Either way, the name became popular after the 12th century when returning Crusaders from the Holy Land would often called their children by biblical names in commemoration of their fathers pilgrimage, these then in turn developed into surname.

The Jaggi surname is originated originally from India, [[North side]. Language spoken by such people is Hindi as they belong to Rajput community 

People with surname "Jaggi" belonged to the ancient "Mohenjo-Daro" Rajput Kastriya community which is in present day Pakistan on the banks of Sindhu river.    

Due to partition of India and Pakistan in 1947, being firm Hindus, most of these people migrated from Pakistan to India along with other castes like the Sindhis etc. Thus, they do not have a specific village/place of resident and are found in various parts of India and other countries.     

They originated originally from Pakistan, Peshawar, Rawalpindi. Language spoken by such people is Pashto as they also belonged to Pashtuni region.   
  
Notable people with the name include:

Surname
Allen Jaggi (born 1944), member of the Wyoming House of Representatives
Ishank Jaggi (born 1989), Indian cricketer
 Maya Jaggi, writer, literary critic and editor
 Michèle Jäggi, Swiss curler
 Steve Jaggi, Film and TV Producer
Given name
 Jaggi Singh (activist) (born 1971), Canadian anti-globalization and social justice activist
 Jaggi Singh (actor) (born 1989), Panjabi actor and film producer
 Sadhguru Jaggi Vasudev, Indian yogi and mystic
Pseudonym
 R. Jagannathan, also known as Jaggi, Indian journalist

References 

https://www.ancestry.com/name-origin?surname=jaggi
https://www.surnamedb.com/Surname/Jaggi
https://m.name-doctor.com/jaggi/
https://www.surnamedb.com/Surname/Jaggi

See also
 Jaggie, in computer graphics